The polity of Sanmalan is a precolonial Philippine state centered on what is now Zamboanga. Labeled in Chinese annals as "Sanmalan" 三麻蘭. The Chinese recorded a year 1011 tribute from its Rajah or King, Chulan, who was represented at the imperial court by his emissary Ali Bakti. Rajah Chulan who may be like their Hindu neighbors, the Rajahnates of Cebu and Butuan, be Hindu kingdoms ruled by Rajahs from India. Sanmalan specifically being ruled by a Tamil from the Chola Dynasty, as Chulan is the local Malay pronunciation of the Chola surname. The Chulan ruler of Sanmalan, may be associated with the Cholan conquest of Srivijaya. This theory is corroborated by linguistics and genetics as Zamboanga is, according to anthropologist Alfred Kemp Pallasen the linguistic homeland of the Sama-Bajau people, and genetic studies also show that they have Indian admixture, specifically the tribe of the Sama-Dilaut.

The tribute born by Rajah Chulan to the Chinese Emperor included aromatics, dates, glassware, ivory, peaches, refined sugar, and rose- water, which suggests that Sanmalan had trade links into Western Asia.

The later Chinese historical chronicle Zhufan zhi 諸蕃志 published at 1225; wrote once again about Sanmalan but it was now known as Shahuagong. In contrast to its previous mention as a trade emporium, it became a pirate-state driven by slave raiding.

When the Spanish arrived, they gave protectorate status to the ancient Rajahnate of Sanmalan which was before them, conquered by the Sultanate of Sulu. Under Spanish rule, the location of Sanmalan received Mexican and Peruvian military immigrants. After a rebellion against Spanish rule, the state that replaced Spain and had subsisted on what was once Sanmalan's location, was the short-lived Republic of Zamboanga.

References 

Former countries in Philippine history